Gaïtcha FCN is a New Caledonia football team playing in the local top division, the New Caledonia Division Honneur. The team is based in Nouméa.

Achievements
New Caledonia Division Honneur: 2
 1999, 2013

Football clubs in New Caledonia